Hanibal Srouji (born 1957 in Beirut, Lebanon) is a Lebanese painter. He graduated in 1987 from Concordia University, Montreal. He lived in Canada and France before returning in his country. Srouji developed a technique of burning holes in his paintings after having participated to numerous workshops in America and Europe, including the Triangle Arts Trust. He currently teaches at the Lebanese American University.

Life and work
Srouji's art deals with his nostalgia for Lebanon, as he emigrated at the beginning of the Lebanese Civil War. At the beginning of the war, Srouji served as Red Cross volunteer in Southern Lebanon, an experience he later compared to horror movies. He ultimately escaped from Sidon by boat to Cyprus before emigrating to Canada. Shortly after the end of the war, Srouji traveled back to Lebanon to try to pick up the pieces.

Hanibal Srouji became known for using a blow-torch to create small hales and lines. His paintings remind one of bullet-marked walls of crippled buildings in Beirut and encompass the human emotions in the aftermath of the civil war. Another series has been dominated by vertical lines that represent the bars of a cage, as signs of confinement, but can also be read as bars of a musical composition.

Although Srouji is considered as an abstract painter, his recent work, Terre/Mer ("land/sea"), evoked landscapes.

Awards

 Ahmed Asseleh Prize, Algiers, 1999
 "Mérite et dévouement français", Art Silver Medal, 1997
 49th Saint-Cloud exhibition Grand Prize, Musée des Avelines, 1997.

Publications

 Hanibal Srouji: Painting fire, water, earth and air, Gregory Buchakjian and Sary Tadros (Galerie Janine Rubeiz, 2013)
 Paroles d’Artistes: Hanibal Srouji (L’Agenda Culturel, 2010)

Selected exhibitions

Solo exhibitions
"Anti Gravity", Galerie Eulenspiegel, Basel, Switzerland,2016 
Into the Clouds, Singapore Art Fair, with Galerie Janine Rubeiz, Singapore, 2014
Head in the Clouds, Galerie Janine Rubeiz, Beirut, 2014 
Cages, June Kelly Gallery, New York, 2011
Healing Bands, Europia, Paris, 2011
Hanibal Srouji, FFA Private Bank, Beirut, 2010
Healing Bands, Galerie Eulenspiegel, Basel, 2009
Offrandes, Galerie Janine Rubeiz, Beirut, 2009
Touches, Galerie Janine Rubeiz, Beirut, 2006
Hanibal Srouji, Service Culturel Municipal, Gentilly, 2005
Hanibal Srouji, Galerie Eulenspiegel, Basel, 2004
Hanibal Srouji, Galerie Janine Rubeiz, Beirut, 2003
Transformations, Galerie Janine Rubeiz, Beirut, 2003
Particules, Galerie Janine Rubeiz, Beirut, 1997

Group exhibitions
"Musee Sursock, 32e Salon  D’AutomneE", Sursock Museum, Beirut, 2016	
"BITASARROF", the Lebanese national Library, 2016	
"MAC International", The MAC's first open arts prize – Shortlisted 2014 – Belfast, Northern Ireland, 2014 – 
"Syri-Arts, 101 Works of Art for Syrian Refugee Children in Lebanon", Beirut Exhibition Center, 2013
"Tjreed – a selection of Arab Abstract Art, 1908–1960", CAP, Contemporary Art Platform, Kuwait, 2013
"Vous avez dit Abstrait" – Exposition collective, Galerie Tanit, Beirut, 2013
"Art  Dubai, 2013",  & "ABU DHABI Art, 2013",  Galerie Janine Rubeiz, UAE, 2013
Pellicula, Galerie Janine Rubeiz, Beirut, 2013
Vous avez dit abstrait?, Galerie Tanit, Beirut, 2013
Subtitled: With Narratives from Lebanon, Royal College of Art, London, 2011
Rebirth, Lebanon 21st Century Contemporary Art, Beirut Exhibition Art Center, Beirut, 2011 
Convergence, New Art from Lebanon, The American University Museum, Katzen Arts Center, Washington DC, 2010

References

External links
Website of Hanibal Srouji
Hanibal Srouji at Galerie Janine Rubeiz
Hanibal Srouji at Europia Productions: Complete list of exhibitions and collections
Hanibal Srouji at Galerie Eulenspiegel, Basel

Lebanese painters
Artists from Beirut
1957 births
Living people
Concordia University alumni
Academic staff of Lebanese American University